Rikke Hørlykke Jørgensen (born 2 May 1976) is a former Danish team handball player and Olympic champion. She received a gold medal with the Danish national team at the 2004 Summer Olympics in Athens.

In 2000, she married the handball player Klavs Jørgensen.

References

External links
 
 
 

1976 births
Living people
Danish female handball players
Olympic gold medalists for Denmark
Handball players at the 2004 Summer Olympics
Olympic medalists in handball
Medalists at the 2004 Summer Olympics
21st-century Danish women